Stefan Vogenauer (born 1968) is a German legal scholar who is the director of the Max Planck Institute for European Legal History. He was previously Linklaters Professor of Comparative Law at the University of Oxford.

References

German legal scholars
Living people
1968 births
Linklaters Professors of Comparative Law
Max Planck Institute directors